Sonny Caldinez (1 July 1932 – 12 April 2022) was a Trinidadian actor and professional wrestler. He was often cast in television and films for his great height and muscular physique. He appeared as various Ice Warriors on the British programme Doctor Who and also in films such as The Man with the Golden Gun, Raiders of the Lost Ark, Ali G Indahouse, Arabian Adventure and The Fifth Element.

Caldinez played Ice Warriors in all four of the classic Doctor Who serials in which they appeared. His Ice Warrior roles include Turoc from The Ice Warriors, an unnamed Ice Warrior in The Seeds of Death, Ssorg in The Curse of Peladon and Sskel in The Monster of Peladon. He also appeared as Kemel in The Evil of the Daleks. Other television roles include Abdullah on Sexton and Blake and the mulatto on The Return of Sherlock Holmes (episode "Wisteria Lodge").

Caldinez moved to the U.S. from Trinidad in 2011. He died of a ruptured aortic aneurysm in his personal campsite in La Push, Washington on 12 April 2022, at the age of 89.

Filmography
A Challenge for Robin Hood (1967) – Wrestler (uncredited)
White Cargo (1973) – Bodyguard
The Man with the Golden Gun (1974) – Kra (uncredited)
The Fosters – Series 2, Episode 1: "The Nude" (1977)  – Clyde Davies
Mind Your Language – (TV series) Season 1, episode 4 – Surinders' father (1977)
Arabian Adventure (1979) – Nubian
Raiders of the Lost Ark (1981) – Mean Mongolian
The Fifth Element (1997) – Emperor Kodar Japhet
Ali G Indahouse (2002) – Ambassador (uncredited)

References

External links
 
 

1932 births
2022 deaths
20th-century Trinidad and Tobago male actors
Trinidad and Tobago male film actors
Trinidad and Tobago male television actors
20th-century Trinidad and Tobago actors
21st-century Trinidad and Tobago actors
21st-century Trinidad and Tobago male actors